Eduard Janota (13 March 1952 – 20 May 2011) was a Czech economist and politician who served as the Minister of Finance from 2009 to 2010 in the caretaker government of Jan Fischer.

He died aged 59 on 20 May 2011, while playing tennis.

References 

1952 births
2011 deaths
20th-century Czech economists
Prague University of Economics and Business alumni
Finance ministers of the Czech Republic
Recipients of Medal of Merit (Czech Republic)
Civic Democratic Party (Czech Republic) Government ministers
Czechoslovak economists